Richard Baird (20 February 1892 – 27 February 1977) was an English professional association footballer who played as a winger. He played two matches in the Football League Third Division North for Nelson in the 1921–22 season.

References

1892 births
1977 deaths
People from Nelson, Lancashire
English footballers
Association football wingers
Nelson F.C. players
Bacup Borough F.C. players
Rossendale United F.C. players
Chorley F.C. players
English Football League players
Great Harwood F.C. players
Colne Town F.C. players